1728 is the natural number following 1727 and preceding 1729. 1728 is a dozen gross, one great gross (or grand gross).

It is the number of cubic inches in a cubic foot.

It is also the number of daily chants of the Hare Krishna mantra  by a Hare Krishna devotee. The number comes from 16 rounds on a 108 japamala bead.

In mathematics
1728 is the cube of 12 and, as such, is important in the duodecimal number system, in which it is represented as "1000". 

 1728 = 123
 1728 = 33 × 43
 1728 = 23 × 63
 1728 = 63 + 83 + 103
 1728 = 242 + 242 + 242
 1728 = 2893 + 2873 + (−288)3 + (−288)3
 28 divisors (perfect count): 1, 2, 3, 4, 6, 8, 9, 12, 16, 18, 24, 27, 32, 36, 48, 54, 64, 72, 96, 108, 144, 192, 216, 288, 432, 576, 864, 1728

1728 is the number of directed open knight's tours on a  chessboard.

1728 occurs in the algebraic formula for the j-invariant of an elliptic curve, as a function over a complex variable on the upper half-plane ,

1728 is one less than the first Hardy–Ramanujan or taxicab number, 1729.

See Also
The year 1728 A.D.

References

Integers